Frederick William Wadely OBE FRCO (30 July 1882 - 28 May 1970) was an English organist and composer.

Background

He was born in Kidderminster in 1882, the son of organist William Edward Wadely and Zoe (née Gilbert).

He was trained at the Royal College of Music and was then organ scholar at Selwyn College, Cambridge.

He married Ethel Muriel Stokes in 1910. They had three children:
Zoe Beatrice Wadely (1912 – 1990)
Michael Wadely (1916 – 1999)
Beryl Wadely
He was awarded Honorary Fellowship of the Royal School of Church Music in 1947.

Appointments

Organ scholar at Selwyn College, Cambridge 1900 – 1903
Organist of St. Andrew’s Church, Uxbridge 1903 – 1904
Organist of Malvern Priory 1904 - 1910
Organist of Carlisle Cathedral 1910 - 1960

List of compositions

Church music
Magnificat and Nunc Dimittis in B flat - 1904 (unpublished)
O whither would ye go? (carol - words by Canon Anthony Deane of Malvern) - Stainer & Bell 1911
Give peace in our time - Novello 1914
Peace I leave with you - Stainer & Bell 1914
The strife is o’er - Stainer & Bell 1916
There shall come forth a rod - Novello 1917
If ye then be risen with Christ - Novello 1918
Three in One and One in Three - Novello 1918
Lead us, Heavenly Father - Novello 1919
The night was dark (carol - words by H. D. Rawnsley) - Stainer & Bell 1919
O Loving Saviour (words by James Walter Brown) - Novello 1920
And thou Bethlehem - Novello 1920
Praise O praise our God and King - Novello 1925
Turn thou us - Novello 1927
O God of Wisdom (words by James Walter Brown) - Novello 1928
Hail the Babe (carol - words by James Walter Brown) - Stainer & Bell 1928
I sing Thy birth - Novello 1930
Communion Service in F minor - Novello 1930
Bread of Heaven - OUP 1931
Our Blest Redeemer (York Diocesan Choral Association) - Novello 1932
Communion Service in G (composed by invitation for the RSCM) - Faith Press 1933
Hear my crying - Novello 1934
Light’s glittering morn - Novello 1936
Christ is our cornerstone (chorus and orchestra - composed by invitation for the Festival of the Sons of the Clergy in St Paul’s Cathedral) - Novello 1936
That God doth love the world we know - OUP 1937
Lord of the Harvest - Faith Press 1937
Te Deum in E flat - Novello 1937
Magnificat and Nunc Dimittis in G - Novello 1938
Come, Thou Holy Spirit - Novello 1938
I will lift up mine eyes - Novello 1940
Morning and Evening Service in A (Te Deum, Jubilate, Magnificat and Nunc Dimittis) c.1940? (unpublished: hectograph copy of vocal score held in Carlisle Archive Centre ref. DCHA/2/4/11 - organ part is unfortunately missing)
Magnificat and Nunc Dimittis in E flat - Novello 1941
Forth in Thy Name - Novello 1947
The Saints of God - Novello 1947
Christians, be joyful - Novello 1949
At the Lamb’s High Feast we sing - OUP 1949
Come, let us join - Novello 1950
O Saving Victim - Novello 1950
Communion Service in E flat - Novello 1952
Christ is risen from the dead - OUP 1952
Sing we the Birth - OUP 1956
And the Lord said to Solomon - c.1958 (unpublished)
There shall be signs in the sun - Novello 1959
Cast thy bread upon the waters - Stainer & Bell 1963
At least nine Anglican chants

Songs and Partsongs
Three Songs from Shelley (The Widow Bird; The World’s Wanderers; To Jane) - unpublished MS (c.1907)
A Farewell (Partsong in Canon) - Novello 1909
Song of the Bell - Stainer & Bell 1911
O for the swords of former time - Stainer & Bell 1913
Far among the lonely hills - Curwen 1913
The bag of the bee (Partsong in Canon) - Curwen 1915
Under the green hedges - Year Book Press 1916
The First Swallow - Joseph Williams 1916
Hark! ‘tis the breeze - Curwen 1917
The Daisy’s Song - Curwen 1919
Heaven overarches earth and sea - Curwen 1920
Beacons (words by James Walter Brown) - Novello 1920
The Rain - Edward Arnold 1920
Hymn to Pan - Curwen 1925
The Snail - Curwen 1926
Life, I know not what thou art - Novello 1929
I loved a lass - Novello 1929
O mistress mine - Boosey 1929
The Two Sisters (chorus and orchestra: later included in the Old English Suite) - Novello 1930
Care for thy soul - Novello 1930
The Faithless Shepherdess - Year Book Press 1931
Love is a sickness - Stainer & Bell 1931
The Butterfly - Novello 1933
Lo! here, beneath this hallowed shade - Stainer & Bell 1933
Who killed Cock Robin? - Stainer & Bell 1934
Fain would I change that note - Boosey 1934
Birds upward winging (chorus and orchestra - words by T. Dowell) - Boosey 1935
The Toy Dragon - OUP 1937
The Jackdaw - Novello 1938
Beautiful Soup (song from Alice in Wonderland) - Novello 1939
Abou Ben Adhem - Novello 1941
Old English Suite (chorus and orchestra - inc. The Two Sisters named above) - Novello 1949
Oranges and Lemons (SSA Trio arrangement of movement (originally SATB) from the Old English Suite) - Novello 1951 
Welcome, sweet pleasure - Novello 1951
The Lobster Quadrille (from Alice in Wonderland) - Novello 1955
Breathes there the man? - Novello 1956
Bonnie Gallowa’ (arrangement of a melody by G. F. Hornsby) - Bosworth 1956
The Owl and the Pussy cat - Novello 1958
The glories of our blood and state - Novello 1963
The mouse in the wainscot - Novello 1963
In the dark of Christmas Eve (unpublished - date?)

Organ music
Three Short and Easy Postludes - Novello 1917
Three Short and Easy Postludes - Novello 1922
Three Period Pieces - Bosworth 1948
Prologue from Carlisle Historical Pageant arranged for organ (1966; unpublished MS)

Large-scale works
An Island King (a light opera: book by H. R. Cowell) - 1902 (unpublished)
Four songs for contralto with orchestra (The Widow Bird, The Rose Tree, Night Song, Love in a Mist) - unpublished MS (c.1907)
Three Shelley Lyrics (Serenade, The Story of Proserpine, To the Night)
Three Nursery Rhymes for chorus and orchestra (Old King Cole, Three Blind Mice, Where are you going to my pretty maid)
‘The Merman’ and ‘The Mermaid’ (Tennyson) for chorus and orchestra - c. 1915 (unpublished)
‘John o’ Gaunt’ Overture for orchestra - 1917 (unpublished)
The Prodigal Crusader (a light opera: book by J. S. Eagles) 1924 (privately published)
Irish Suite for orchestra - 1925 (unpublished)
Carlisle Historical Pageant (book by J. S. Eagles) - Novello 1928
Alice in Wonderland (a light opera: book adapted by T. Dowell) - 1938 (privately published)
A Christmas Carol (book adapted by T. Dowell) - Boosey & Hawkes 1938
Pickwick Papers (book adapted by T. Dowell) - 1942 (unpublished)
The Holy Birth (a Nativity Play: words written and selected by Cyril Mayne, Dean of Carlisle) - Novello 1947 (some more music, including a setting of the Benedictus, was written for a later production in 1957)
Overture (for Carlisle Historical Pageant) for orchestra - 1951 (unpublished)
The Progress of Learning (a cantata for the Octocentenary of the City of Carlisle - words by V. J. Dunstan, Headmaster of the Grammar School - unpublished (1958)
In praise of music (for chorus and orchestra) - unpublished

Other music
Two movements from the Bach Suites arranged for string orchestra - Boosey 1936
Miniature Nursery Suite for piano - Curwen 1952
Creighton School Song (for the Creighton School, Carlisle) - words by W. T. McIntire, music co-written by F. W. Wadely and A. Neesham

References

List of compositions compiled from various sources including: British Library catalogue; RSCM Colles Library catalogue; Carlisle Library catalogue; Carlisle Archive Centre catalogue; the Prior’s Tower Archive, Carlisle Cathedral.

1882 births
1970 deaths
English organists
British male organists
English composers
Alumni of Selwyn College, Cambridge
Fellows of the Royal College of Organists
Members of the Order of the British Empire
20th-century organists
20th-century British male musicians